The Kawasaki Ninja 400 is a 399 cc Ninja series sport bike introduced by Kawasaki in 1994 originally. It was then recreated as a successor to the Ninja 300. It launched with the 2018 model year.

The Ninja 300 was struggling through Euro 4 emission standards compliance. Therefore, Kawasaki decided to replace it with the Ninja 400 for the 2018 model year. It also has significant upgrades in engine, frame, suspension, and other parts.

Design 
The new bike's styling is similar to Ninja H2 and Ninja ZX-10R (Such as ‘chin-spoilers’ below twin headlamps) and dashboard (information gauge cluster) from Ninja 650. Despite having larger displacement, it is  lighter than the Ninja 300. The engine has a large air-box for intake efficiency along with downdraft air intake. Seat height is 30mm lower than Ninja 300, improving stand-over. It is available with ABS and comes equipped with a slipper clutch. The pull on the clutch is 20% lighter than that of the Ninja 300.

The suspension is stiffer than the Ninja 300 with a larger (41 mm) fork. There are stiffer 5-spoke wheels, similar to the Ninja 650, resulting in low unsprung weight and better cornering stability than predecessors.

Announcement 
The 2018 Ninja 400 was revealed at 2017 Tokyo Motor Show. It is intended for the global market, and Euro 4 compliance suggested that the bike will be brought to Europe market. Kawasaki launched in US on December 1, 2017.

It was launched in Japan in February 2018.

The Ninja 400 launched in India in April 2018. It will be assembled locally in India at  Kawasaki's manufacturing plant in Chakan, Maharashtra. In India, it does not replace the Ninja 300, instead it is sold alongside the Ninja 300. The Ninja 250R is no longer on Kawasaki India's current products list, leaving Z250 the only bike in 250cc category offered by Kawasaki.

Gallery

2022 update 

The engine was made Euro 5 compliant and new colors are available.

See also 
 Kawasaki Ninja Series
 Yamaha R3
 KTM 390 series

References

External links 
 Kawasaki USA(Official website)
 Kawasaki CA(Official website)

Ninja 400
Sport bikes
Motorcycles powered by straight-twin engines